The 2019 World Series of Darts was a series of televised darts tournaments organised by the Professional Darts Corporation. In 2019, there were 5 World Series events and one finals event, which has this year been moved from Vienna, Austria to Amsterdam, Netherlands.

Two new venues made their debuts with Hamilton and Cologne replacing Auckland and Gelsenkirchen respectively.

Prize money

International events

Finals

World Series events

World Series qualifiers

US Masters
  Jeff Smith
  Leonard Gates
  Danny Baggish
  Elliot Milk
  Shawn Brenneman
  Darin Young
  Jim Long
  Gary Mawson

German Masters
  Max Hopp
  Martin Schindler
  Gabriel Clemens
  Nico Kurz
  Kevin Münch
  Christian Bunse
  Robert Marijanović
  Maik Langendorf

Brisbane Masters
  Kyle Anderson
  Corey Cadby
  Damon Heta
  James Bailey
  Haupai Puha
  Koha Kokiri
  Brendon McCausland
  Ben Robb

Melbourne Masters
  Kyle Anderson
  Corey Cadby
  Damon Heta
  James Bailey
  Robbie King
  Tim Pusey 
  Mick Lacey
  Haupai Puha

New Zealand Masters
  Kyle Anderson
  Corey Cadby (withdrew)
  Damon Heta
  Cody Harris
  Haupai Puha
  Craig Caldwell
  Ben Robb
  David Platt
  Warren Parry

2019 World Series Order of Merit
The top eight will qualify for the World Series of Darts Finals and determine their seeding. The table only involves players with at least one win during the 2019 World Series tour.

References

World Series of Darts